Don Campbell is a British reggae singer from north-west London, best known for his lovers rock records released since the mid-1990s.

Biography
Campbell was a member of Undivided Roots in the 1980s, before embarking on a solo career. He released his first single in 1993 and immediately entered the British reggae charts. His first three singles and debut album all topped the charts, and he received six awards at the 1994 British Reggae Industry Awards. He then teamed up with General Saint and released a series of records, including a version of Neil Sedaka's "Oh! Carol", which was a minor UK Singles Chart hit, reaching number 54. They followed this with "Save the Last Dance for Me", which was also a hit, reaching number 75, and "Stop That Train". Their collaborations were collected together on the 1995 album Time on the Move. He has recorded several albums since, recorded a version of the Bee Gees's "Islands in the Stream" with J. C. Lodge, and performed at the Bob Marley Day Festival in Long Beach, California in 2003.

Discography
The Album (1994), Juggling
Time on the Move (1995), Copasetic – with General Saint
Rise Up (2001), Artists Only
Reggae Max (2001), Jet Star
Flex (2001), Angella
Any Day Now (2003), VP
Door No. 1 (2003), Jet Star

References

Living people
British reggae musicians
Singers from London
20th-century Black British male singers
Year of birth missing (living people)
21st-century Black British male singers
VP Records artists